Marthinus Theunis Steyn 'Theuns' Stofberg was the captain of the South Africa national rugby union team (Springboks) for four tests between 1980 and 1984. He is remembered for his speed and his size, both remarkable for a flank at that time.

Youth and early career
He was born Marthinus Theunis Steyn Stofberg (named after the President of the Orange Free State), in Villiers, Free State on 6 June 1955.  He attended school at Grey College in Bloemfontein, one of the strongholds in South African rugby.  He started his provincial career playing for Free State while he was still studying at the University of the Free State.  When he was called up for his conscription he was moved to Pretoria where he started playing for Northern Transvaal, currently called the Blue Bulls.  It was during this time that he went from strength to strength cementing his place in the national side as flanker.

Career
He played his first test on the 14 August 1976 against New Zealand at Free State Stadium, Bloemfontein at the age of 21.  The Springboks lost the test 9-15.

He played in 21 tests and scored 6 tries during this time.  His first test as captain was against the South American Jaguars on the 18 October 1980 in Montevideo where the Springboks won 22-13.  His biggest test as a captain was leading the Springbok side, after the regular captain Wynand Claassen was injured, in the first test of  the infamous 1981 Springbok Tour  of New Zealand.  The tour was disrupted by protesters during the matches and is now seen as one of the most important tours in rugby history.  Stofberg did not play in the last of the three test series, which was stopped momentarily due to a light airplane throwing flour bombs, due to a knee injury that would ultimately end his career.

Stofberg left Northern Transvaal in 1982 and moved to their arch-rivals Western Province Rugby Union where he settled and opened a physiotherapy practice.  Stofberg captained his last two international tests against England in 1984, winning both and scoring a try in the second test.  After yet another series setback due a knee injury he retired from rugby in 1984 at the age of 29. He is the only player in history to have won the Currie Cup with three different teams. He won titles with Free State (1976), Northern Transvaal (1979 and 1980) and Western Province (1982 and 1983). In total he played 7 finals, winning 4 ('76, '80, '82 & '83) and drawing one (1980).

Test history

Personal
He lives in Stellenbosch today where he has a physiotherapy practice.

See also
List of South Africa national rugby union players – Springbok no. 489

References 

1955 births
Living people
People from Mafube Local Municipality
Afrikaner people
South Africa international rugby union players
University of the Free State alumni
Rugby union flankers
Rugby union locks
Free State Cheetahs players
Blue Bulls players
Western Province (rugby union) players
Alumni of Grey College, Bloemfontein
South Africa national rugby union team captains
Rugby union players from the Free State (province)